Coach Trip 5 was the fifth series of Coach Trip in the United Kingdom which was filmed from May until June 2010 (after the Iceland volcanic ash cloud was busy dissipating) and aired from 30 August to 8 October 2010. The show's format changed slightly from previous series and with weekends included, from Day 2 of that the couple who received a yellow card the previous day would be immune from the following vote the next day. The series involves seven couples traveling on a one-month tour centering on Northern European countries for the first time, with visits to Denmark, Finland, Sweden, Norway,  Latvia and Estonia. Tour guide Brendan Sheerin, coach driver Paul Donald and the MT09 MTT registration all returned for this series, which airs on Channel 4. Dave Vitty was the narrator for the first time. This was the first series to feature couples that lasted for the entire trip.

Contestants

Voting history
 Indicates that the couple received the most votes and received a yellow card
 Indicates that the couple were red carded off the trip
 Indicates that the couple left the coach due to other reasons than being voted off or being removed from the coach
 Indicates that the couple had received a yellow card the previous day making them immune from any votes
 Indicates that it was the couple's first vote meaning they could not be voted for
 Indicates that the couple were voted as the most popular couple and won series
 Indicates that the couple were voted as the second most popular couple
 Indicates that the couple were voted as the third most popular couple
 Indicates that the couple were voted as the fourth most popular couple

Notes

No post-vote arrivals or timekeepers in series

The trip day-by-day

{| class="wikitable" style="text-align:center;"
|-
! rowspan=2 |Day
! rowspan=2 |Location
! colspan=2 |Activity
|-
! Morning
! Afternoon
|-
| 1
| Hull
| Maypole dancing
| Hull aquarium
|-
| 2
| Amsterdam
| Canal tour
| Burlesque dancing
|-
| 3 
| North Germany 
| Life drawing
| 
|-
| 4
| Bremen
| 
|
|-
| 5
| Hamburg
| 
| Submarine visit
|-
| 6
| Gothenburg
| Fish market
|
|-
| 7
| Jönköping
| Synchronised swimming
|
|-
| 8
|  Norrköping
| 
| Fire walking
|-
| 9
| Stockholm
| Sightseeing
|
|-
| 10
| Nuuksio Park
| Folk dancing
|
|-
| 11
| Helsinki
| Ice hockey
| Sauna
|-
| 12
| Tallinn
| Stag party pt.1
| Stag party pt.2
|-
| 13
| Parnu
| Glass-making
| Sports day
|-
| 14
| Cēsis
| Medieval games
| Skydiving centre
|-
| 15
| Riga
| Bobsleigh track
| Caviar tasting
|-
| 16
| Šiauliai
| Hill of Crosses
| Folk group party
|-
| 17
| Vilnius
| KGB Museum
| 
|-
| 18
| Kaunas
| Cookery lesson
| Raft building
|-
| 19
| Curonia
| Gutting and smoking fish
| 
|-
| 20
| Klaipeda
| Sea museum
| Beach scouring
|-
| 21
| Malmö
| Rap lesson
|
|-
| 22
| Copenhagen
| City kayaking
|
|-
| 23
| Odense
| Hans Christian Andersen museum
|
|-
| 24
| Aarhus
|
|
|-
| 25
| Aalborg
| 
| Pig farm
|-
| 26
| Norway
| Handball lesson
| Zip wiring
|-
| 27
| Oslo
| Munch museum
|
|-
| 28
| Bergen
| Fjord tour
| Skiing
|-
| 29
| Voss
| White water rafting
| Abseiling 
|-
| 30
| colspan="3" |It's the journey home at the end of the current series, Brendan reminisces about the best and the worst of the last 30 days on the road.

References

2010 British television seasons
Coach Trip series
Television shows set in Estonia
Kingston upon Hull
Television shows set in Denmark
Television shows set in Finland
Television shows set in Germany
Television shows set in Latvia
Television shows set in Lithuania
Television shows set in Norway
Television shows set in Sweden
Television shows set in the Netherlands
Television shows set in Yorkshire